Bernardo Tolomei (10 May 1272 – 20 August 1348) was an Italian Roman Catholic theologian and the founder of the Congregation of the Blessed Virgin of Monte Oliveto. In the Roman Martyrology he is commemorated on August 20, but in the Benedictine calendar his optional memorial is celebrated on the previous day.

Bernardo Tolomei was beatified by Pope Innocent X on 24 November 1644 and was canonized by Pope Benedict XVI on 26 April 2009.

Life
Giovanni Tolomei was born at Siena in Tuscany on the May 10, 1272. He was educated by his uncle, Christopher Tolomeo, a Dominican, and desired to enter the religious life, but his father's opposition prevented him from doing so, and he continued his studies in secular surroundings. After a course in philosophy and mathematics he devoted himself to the study of civil and canon law, and of theology. While studying law in Siena, he joined the Confraternity of the Disciplinati di Santa Maria della Notte dedicated to aiding the sick at the Hospital della Scala. Tolomei became a professor of law at the University of Siena. For a time Tolomei served as a knight in the armies of Rudolph I of Germany. After his return to Siena he was appointed by his fellow citizens to the highest positions in the town government. While thus occupied he was struck with blindness. He is said to have vowed himself to religion in gratitude for the recovery of his eyesight through the intercession of the Blessed Virgin.

In 1313, Giovanni, together with two companions, Patrizio di Francesco Patrizi and Ambrogio di Nino Piccolomini, noble Sienese merchants and members of the same Confraternity, retired to Accona on a property belonging to his family. He had taken the name of "Bernard" (in its Italian form Bernardo) out of admiration for the Abbot of Clairvaux. Here they lived a hermitic penitential life characterised by prayer, manual work and silence.

Towards the end of 1318, or the beginning of 1319, while deep in prayer, he is said to have seen a ladder on which monks in white habits ascended, helped by angels, and awaited by Jesus and Mary. Tolomei founded the Congregation of the Blessed Virgin of Monte Oliveto (the Olivetans), giving it the Rule of St. Benedict. The purpose of the new religious institute was a special devotion to the Blessed Virgin. Bishop Guido Tarlati of Arezzo, within whose diocese the congregation was formed, confirmed its constitution in (1319), and many favours were granted by Popes John XXII, Clement VI (1344), and Gregory XI. Since the Benedictine rule did not prescribe the colour of monastic dress, the Olivetans wore white habits.

Through the generosity of a merchant a monastery was erected at Siena; Tarlati built another at Arezzo; a third sprang up at Florence; and within a very few years there were establishments at Camprena, Volterra, San Geminiano, Eugubio, Foligno, and Rome.

During the Plague of 1348 Tolomei left the solitude of Monte Oliveto for the monastery of San Benedetto a Porta Tufi in Siena. The disease was particularly virulent in the city. Tolomei and his monks devoted themselves to the care of the sick. On 20 August 1348, while helping his plague-stricken monks, he himself, fell victim of the Plague. Eighty-two monks likewise succumbed to the plague.

His last days were depicted in a painting by the 18th-century Italian painter Giuseppe Maria Crespi. His work was entitled: 'The Blessed Bernard Tolomei Interceding for the Cessation of the Plague in Siena' (1735).

After having ruled the religious body he had founded for 27 years Tolomei died, at the age of 76. Tolomei was canonized in 2009.

References 

1272 births
1348 deaths
People from Siena
14th-century Italian Roman Catholic theologians
Italian Roman Catholic saints
14th-century Italian Christian monks
Founders of Catholic religious communities
14th-century deaths from plague (disease)
Angelic visionaries
Marian visionaries
Canonizations by Pope Benedict XVI
Beatifications by Pope Urban VIII